Andalucista Youth (abbreviated JJ.AA.) was the youth wing of Partido Andalucista, in Andalusia, Spain. As of 2012 David Gómez has been the national secretary of JJ.AA. JJ.AA. is a member of the Youth Council of Andalusia. As of 1999, JJ.AA. claimed a membership of 9,864.

JJ.AA. held its third congress in Torremolinos in March 1988. At the congress the organization adopted a resolution calling for the right of self-determination for Andalusia. The congress elected Julián Álvarez, a law student, as its new general secretary. Álvarez later became the general secretary of the mother party.

As of 2007, Miguel Ángel Jiménez has served as the general secretary of JJ.AA. After Jiménez's mandate, a Collegiate Organ manages the organisation.

As of December 2013, after the XIII National Congress held in Coria del Río, Francisco Benítez de la Lama was elected as secretary general.

After mother party's Partido Andalucista dissolution in 2015, Juventudes Andalucistas kept their political activity focusing in the Andalusian youth.

References

External links

Youth wings of political parties in Spain
Andalusian nationalist parties